Lucian Dunăreanu (born 22 November 1977) is a Romanian gay rights activist and the executive director of Be An Angel Romania, an LGBT rights organisation based in Cluj-Napoca, now PRIDE ROMÂNIA.

LGBT activities
Since 2004 he has organized the Gay Film Nights Festival, which includes, alongside a film festival, the Miss Travesty contest and the Gay Prize Gala for contributions to Romania's LGBT community. Dunăreanu is the editor of Romania's first LGBT magazine, Angelicuss; he was also editor of the short-lived Switch magazine.

Dunareanu is the owner of the Veverițele Vesele - ex-Toxice musical group, which is the first professional drag queen band in Romania, and was the first Romanian group of its kind to enter the Eurovision national preselection and Romanian TV shows Mondenii and Românii au talent. The slogan of Veverițele Vesele is that "Drag queen is an art and has nothing to do with sexual orientation".

Alongside these activities, Dunăreanu also participates in AIDS awareness and prevention campaigns and is the owner of Delirio clubs (LGBT clubs).

See also
Gay rights in Romania
Gay Film Nights

References

External links

 The chilling life story of a homosexual? No, the life story of a remarkable man: Lucian Dunăreanu (Romanian) 

 Success in a world of prejudice. The story of Cluj's only gay club (Romanian) 

 Rainbow people. Through culture, against walls. (Romanian)

21st-century Romanian LGBT people
Living people
Romanian gay men
Romanian human rights activists
Romanian LGBT rights activists
1987 births